I'm a Dirty Dinosaur is a 2013 Children's picture book written by Janeen Brian and illustrated by Ann James. It is about a small dinosaur that revels in covering itself in mud then goes to a swamp to get clean.

Publication history
2013, Australia, Penguin Books 
2014, USA, Kane/Miller

Reception
A star review in Kirkus Reviews of I'm a Dirty Dinosaur wrote "It is nearly impossible to look at without reading aloud, chanting aloud, and even tapping and stamping and sliding: extreme joyousness." Publishers Weekly wrote "Brian’s narrative lends itself to reading aloud, and it invites both chiming in and imitating the dinosaur’s movements (preferably sans mud)."

I'm a Dirty Dinosaur has also been reviewed by School Library Journal, Reading Time, Magpies, and Scan: The Journal For Educators.

It won a 2014 Speech Pathology of Australia Award, and is a 2014 CBCA Book of the Year: Early Childhood honour book, with the judges noting its "sharp, lilting language to convey the light-hearted, fun filled celebration of guilt free playing in the mud." and " the illustrator’s seemingly effortless outline drawings, ..".

There is a sculpture of the little dinosaur at the Storybook Walk, Thalassa Park, Onkaparina, South Australia.

References

External links

Library holdings of I'm a Dirty Dinosaur

2013 children's books
Anthropomorphic dinosaurs
Australian picture books